Roadcraft refers to the system of car or motorcycle control outlined in two books Roadcraft: The Police Driver's Handbook and Motorcycle Roadcraft: The Police Rider's Handbook. The books are produced by the Police Foundation and published by His Majesty's Stationery Office (HMSO).

Overview 
Roadcraft is the UK's police handbook that outlines a system of car and motorcycle control split into four phases represented by the acronym PSGA: 
 Information is not a phase in itself but is  received from the outside world by observation, and given by use of signals such as direction indicators, headlamp flashes, and horn; is a general theme running continuously throughout the application of the system by taking, using and giving information;
 Position on the road optimised for safety, visibility and correct routing, followed by best progress;
 Speed appropriate to the hazard being approached, attained via explicit braking or throttle control (engine braking), always being able to stop in the distance you can see to be clear on your side of the road;
 Gear appropriate for maximum vehicle control through the hazard, selected in one shift; and
 Acceleration for clearing the hazard safely.
The taking, using and giving of Information is, arguably, most important and surrounds (and drives) the four phases PSGA. It may, and often should, be re-applied at any phase in the System.

The System is used whenever a hazard requires a manoeuvre.  A hazard is something which requires a change in speed, direction or both.  The benefit of applying a systematic approach to driving is to reduce the simultaneous demands on the vehicle, the driver mentally and the driver physically.  That is, the System seeks to separate out the phases of a manoeuvre into a logical sequence so that the vehicle and the driver avoid being overwhelmed by having to do too much at the same time.  For example, braking and steering at the same time place greater demands on the vehicle's available grip and in the worst case can lead to a skid.

Whilst the books were originally put together at the Metropolitan Police Driving School at Hendon, and intended for police drivers and riders, they have been available for sale to the general public since the mid-1950s.  Civilian advanced driving organisations such as RoSPA and the Institute of Advanced Motorists base their teaching and advanced motoring tests on Roadcraft.

References

External links
 Roadcraft homepage

Automotive safety
Motorcycle training
Driving techniques